James Richard Brandt (born May 19, 1929) is a former American football player who played three seasons with the Pittsburgh Steelers of the National Football League (NFL). He was drafted by the Pittsburgh Steelers in the 12th round of the 1951 NFL Draft. He played college football at the College of St. Thomas and attended Bold High School in Olivia, Minnesota. He was also a member of the Montreal Alouettes of the Canadian Football League (CFL).

References

External links
Just Sports Stats

Living people
1929 births
Players of American football from North Dakota
American football defensive backs
American football halfbacks
American players of Canadian football
St. Thomas (Minnesota) Tommies football players
Pittsburgh Steelers players
Montreal Alouettes players
Sportspeople from Fargo, North Dakota